Anton Hansen (26 November 1886 – 5 May 1915) was a Norwegian cyclist. He competed in two events at the 1912 Summer Olympics.

References

External links
 

1886 births
1915 deaths
Norwegian male cyclists
Olympic cyclists of Norway
Cyclists at the 1912 Summer Olympics
Sportspeople from Fredrikstad